The LXVI Army Corps, initially known as the LXVI Reserve Corps, was an army corps of the German Wehrmacht during World War II. The corps was formed in September 1942.

History 
The LXVI Reserve Corps was formed on 21 September 1942 in Wehrkreis IX. The initial purpose of the corps staff was to oversee and lead the reserve divisions of Oberbefehlshaber West (Army Group D). Its headquarters were initially deployed in the Clermont-Ferrand area. The initial corps commander during the formation of the LXVI Reserve Corps was Erich Marcks, but Marcks was soon succeeded by Baptist Knieß on 12 November 1942.

The LXVI Reserve Corps oversaw the formation of the LXXVI Panzer Corps on 25 February 1943. On 7 July 1943, Knieß was succeeded as the corps commander by Wilhelm Wetzel. Wetzel was in turn succeeded by Walther Lucht on 20 December 1943.

Having received a new military postal number in June 1943, the LXVI Reserve Corps was renamed LXVI Army Corps on 5 August 1944. Subsequently, the corps was used in combat on the Western Front, including in the Vosges, Eifel and Ardennes region. It was subsequently subordinate, in order, to the 19th Army in September 1944, the 7th Army between October and December 1944, the 6th Panzer Army in January 1945, the 5th Panzer Army between February and March 1945, and the 11th Army in April 1945.

Structure

Noteworthy individuals 

 Erich Marcks, corps commander of LXVI Reserve Corps between 21 September 1942 and 12 November 1942.
 Baptist Knieß, corps commander of LXVI Reserve Corps between 12 November 1942 and 10 May 1943 and between June 1943 and 7 July 1943.
 Otto Roettig, corps commander of LXVI Reserve Corps between 21 May 1943 and June 1943.
 Wilhelm Wetzel, corps commander of LXVI Reserve Corps between 7 July 1943 and 20 December 1943.
 Walther Lucht, corps commander of LXVI Reserve Corps between 20 December 1943 and 5 August 1944, corps commander of the renamed LXVI Army Corps between 5 August 1944 and 3 April 1945.
 Hermann Flörke, corps commander of LXVI Army Corps between 3 April 1945 and the end of the war.

References 

Corps of Germany in World War II
Military units and formations established in 1942
Military units and formations disestablished in 1945